The Scavengers  is a 1959 Filipino crime film that was directed by John Cromwell, and starred Vince Edwards and Carol Ohmart. Shot on location in the Crown Colony of Hong Kong, it was produced by former US Navy fighter pilot  Kane W. Lynn and Filipino director Eddie Romero (who also wrote the screenplay). It was released in December 1959 as a double feature in the U.S. with Terror Is a Man by Hal Roach's Valiant Pictures.

The Scavengers was re-released in 1963 as City of Sin by Lynn's new company, Hemisphere Pictures.

Plot 
Former Korean War pilot Stuart Allison has been searching the Orient for his wife who deserted him six years ago. Now running a smuggling operation in Hong Kong, he sights his wife Marian boarding a ferry to Macau.  Allison is pursued by both the Royal Hong Kong Police and a mystery man named O'Hara, who inform him that his wife is now a cocaine addict and involved in smuggling stolen bonds embezzled by a missing former Nationalist Chinese general.

Cast 
Vince Edwards   ...  Stuart Allison 
Carol Ohmart   ...  Marian Allison 
Richard Loo  ...  General Woo    
Tamar Benamy   ... Marissa 
 John Wallace   ... Taggert 
Efren Reyes, Sr.   ...  Puan 
Vic Diaz   ...  Casimir O'Hara
Mario Barri ... Hong Kong Police Inspector
Eddie Infante
Renato Robles

Production
The film was director John Cromwell's penultimate feature film.  Making their debuts in the film were Jerusalem born dancer Tamar Benamy (born Tamar Ben-Ami March 9, 1937 - August 31, 1997) and RTHK broadcaster John Wallace, who also appeared in Ferry to Hong Kong.  The film is credited as "introducing" Vic Diaz, though he had previously appeared in several Philippine films. Ohmart was cast by Cromwell, who had seen her in similar films.

References

External links

1959 films
Films directed by John Cromwell
Philippine black-and-white films
Films set in Hong Kong
Films shot in Hong Kong
1959 adventure films
1959 crime films
Film noir
Films set in Macau
Philippine adventure films
Philippine crime films
1950s English-language films